The 2014 Kingston upon Thames Council election took place on 22 May 2014 to elect members of Kingston upon Thames Council in England. This was on the same day as other local elections.

Results
The Conservative Party gained control from the Liberal Democrats. The Conservatives won 28 seats (+7), the Liberal Democrats won 18 seats (-9) and Labour won 2 seats (+2).

Results by ward

Alexandra

Berrylands

Beverley

Canbury

Rebekah Moll was a sitting councillor, but for Grove ward.

Timothy Dennen was elected as a Liberal Democrat in 2010.

Chessington North & Hook

Chessington South

Coombe Hill

Coombe Vale

Grove

Stephen Brister was a sitting councillor, but for Norbiton ward.

Norbiton

Sheila Griffin was a Labour councillor prior to 2010, when she stood as an Independent. Changes in her vote share are from her performance as an Independent in 2010, rather than the Labour candidate.

Old Malden

St James

St Mark's

Surbiton Hill

Tolworth and Hook Rise

Tudor

By-elections: 2014–2018
A by-election was held in Tudor ward following the resignation of Frank Thompson.

 

A by-election was held in St James ward following the death of Howard Jones.

 

A by-election was held in Grove ward following the resignation of Stephen Brister.

 

A by-election was held in Tolworth and Hook Rise ward following the resignation of Vicki Harris.

 

 

A by-election was held in Grove ward following the death of Chrissie Hitchcock.

References

Kingston upon Thames
2014